Émile Leblanc  (24 March 1907 – 28 January 1944) was a French flying ace of World War II.

Bibliography

1907 births
1944 deaths
Aviators killed in aviation accidents or incidents
French Air and Space Force personnel
French military personnel killed in World War II
French Air Force personnel of World War II
French World War II flying aces
Victims of aviation accidents or incidents in Algeria
Victims of aviation accidents or incidents in 1944